Just Another Day may refer to:

Music 
 Just Another Day (album), an album by Wire Daisies
 "Just Another Day...", a song by Queen Latifah
 "Just Another Day", a song by The Game from the album Compton
 "Just Another Day", a song by Too Short from the album Get in Where You Fit In
 "Just Another Day" (Jon Secada song)
 "Just Another Day" (Jonathan Wilkes song)
 "Just Another Day", a song by Jade Valerie from Out of the Box
 "Just Another Day", a song by John Cena from You Can't See Me
 "Just Another Day" (John Mellencamp song)
 "Just Another Day", a song by Lady Gaga from the deluxe version of Joanne
 "Just Another Day", a song by Oingo Boingo from Dead Man's Party
 "Just Another Day", a song from the musical Next to Normal

Film and television 
 Just Another Day (film), a 2008 short film by Hisham Zreiq
 Just Another Day (TV series), a 1980s BBC documentary series narrated by John Pitman
 Just Another Day (2007 TV series), a TV program on the History Channel UK presented by Adam Hart-Davis
 "Just Another Day", an episode of Pee-wee's Playhouse

See also
Just One Day (disambiguation)
"Another Day" (Paul McCartney song)